The Brunei national under-17 football team is the under-17 football team of Brunei and is controlled by the Football Association of Brunei Darussalam.

International records

FIFA U-17 World Cup

AFC U-17 Asian Cup

AFF U-16 Championship

Fixtures and results

2022

2022 AFF U-16 Youth Championship

2023 AFC U-17 Asian Cup qualification

Coaching staff

Current squad
Squad for the 2023 AFC U-17 Asian Cup qualification held in Uzbekistan in October 2022.

Recent call-ups
The following players have also been called up to the Brunei under-17 squad in the last twelve months.

Former Coaches

  Stephen Ng Heng Seng

References

 u17
Brunei